Transport and Telecommunication Institute (TTI) (TSI) (ИТС) (previously known as RCAII and Riga Aviation University) is the largest university-type accredited non-state technical higher educational and scientific establishment in Riga, the capital of Latvia. It was established in 1999, although it also incorporates the core of a technical and aviation school which dates back to 1919. Main directions of academic activities include electronics and telecommunications, information technology and computer science, economics, management and business administration, transport and logistics.

History

Prehistory 
The School of Aviation Mechanical Technicians was founded in Kiev, on May 24, 1919. The aircraft repair shops and pilot school were used as the school base. From Kiev, the school had been evacuated to Moscow and in 1921 it was relocated to Petrograd and renamed as Advanced Training Courses for Engineering Staff.

In 1938–39, a status of this educational establishment was changed due to the prevailing number of students and listeners raising the level of their skills. In May 1938 the courses were given a new name of First Aircraft Maintenance School. The school was renamed yet again in 1939. In 1946 it was reorganized as the First Leningrad Higher Military Aviation Engineering School.

Relocation to Latvia 
In June 1945 the school was relocated to Riga. In Riga, also the Second Leningrad Higher Military Aviation Engineering School was functioning that had been reorganized from the technical school with similar name. Both schools had two faculties. The first was for engineering and special electrical equipment, the second was for radio engineering and air armaments. In 1949 the schools merged to form Riga Higher Military Aviation Engineering School. In June 1960 the school was broken up and on its base the civil higher school was founded, the Riga Civil Air Fleet Engineers Institute. In 1967 in connection with the reorganization of the Main Directorate of Civil Air Fleet into the Ministry of Civil Aviation, the higher school was named as the Riga Civil Aviation Engineers Institute (RIIGA). On 25 February 1992, the RIIGA passed under the jurisdiction of the Latvian Republic and changed its name to the Riga Aviation Institute. By its 80th anniversary the RAU was the largest higher school in Latvia holding a third place in the ranking of the educational establishments in the country.

Founding of the current institute 
At the end of the 1990s the higher school faced a number of internal and external problems, and in August 1999 the Cabinet of Latvia made a decision about the liquidation of the RAU as the governmental higher school. Such wording encouraged its employees to reorganize this educational establishment by now into a non-governmental institution. On 6 September 1999, the joint stock company "Riga Aviation University" had been registered and from October of the same year it was renamed into the Transport and Telecommunication Institute. TTI has been included into the Training Directory of the International Civil Aviation Organization (ICAO).

Study programmes
 Master's degree study programmes:
Master of Social Sciences in Economics
 Master of Social Sciences in Management Science
Master of Engineering Sciences in Electronics
 Master of Natural Sciences in Computer Science
 Master of Engineering Science in "Management of Information Systems"
 Master of Transport and Logistics
Bachelor's degree study programmes:
Economics
Management science
Electronics
Telecommunication systems and computer networks
Computer science
Engineering science (commercial transport operation)
Aviation Transport
Higher professional study programmes (II level)
Electronics
Transport and business logistics
 Transport management
 Higher professional study programme (I level)
Technical maintenance of aviation transport

Faculties
The institute is divided into several faculties, including:
 Faculty of Computer Science and Electronics
Mathematical methods
Computer networks
 Electronics
 Telecommunications
 Faculty of Management Sciences, Economics and Transport
 Management
 Economics
 Transportation technology and logistics
 Social sciences and law
 Department of Continuing Education
 Department of Basic Sciences
 Mathematics
Physics
Linguistics
 Telematics and Logistics Institute
 Leadership Institute
 Latgale branch

References 

http://www.tsi.lv/?id=405&lang=en&ct=1&cid=2458&r=1201&top=0
http://www.tsi.lv/?id=92&lang=en&ct=2&cid=2586&r=405&top=0
http://www.tsi.lv/?id=1407&lang=en&ct=8&r=405&top=120

External links
The English version of the web site of the TTI

Universities and colleges in Latvia
Education in Riga
Educational institutions established in 1999
1999 establishments in Latvia
Telecommunication education